The 1938 season of the Mitropa Cup football club tournament was won by SK Slavia Prague who defeated the previous season's champions Ferencváros 4–2 on aggregate in the final. It was Slavia Prague's first and only victory in the competition.

This was the 12th edition of the tournament.

First round

|}

Quarterfinals

|}

Semifinals

|}

Finals

|}

Top goalscorers

External links

References

1938–39
1938–39 in European football
1938–39 in Czechoslovak football
1938–39 in Hungarian football
1938–39 in Italian football
1938–39 in Romanian football
1938–39 in Yugoslav football